Charlie Lake is a lake in north-eastern British Columbia, Canada, situated  west from Fort St. John, along the Alaska Highway. The lake provides the water supply for the city of Fort St. John.  
The Charlie Lake Formation, a stratigraphical unit of the Western Canadian Sedimentary Basin is named for the lake.

Geography
It is formed along the Stoddart Creek, a right tributary of the Beatton River, itself a major tributary of the Peace River.

Two parks are established on the shores of the lake, Charlie Lake Provincial Park on the west shore, and Beatton Provincial Park on the east shore. The settlement of Charlie Lake lies at the southern tip of the lake.

See also
Charlie Lake Cave

References

Lakes of British Columbia
Peace River Country
Peace River Land District